Helena Arnell-Gezelius (1697 – 1 August 1751) was one of the first painters in Finland.

She was the daughter of a Swedish nobleman Jonas Lauréntii Arnell and Helena Adlerberg. In 1720 she married  – doctor of theology and bishop of Porvoo. They had a son named  (later Olivecreutz).

After her husband died in 1733, Helena moved to Sauvo.

Works

References

1697 births
1751 deaths
18th-century Finnish artists
18th-century Finnish painters
18th-century Finnish women artists
Finnish women painters
Artists from Stockholm